Wauchope Castle was a castle located at Wauchope, in Dumfries and Galloway, Scotland.

The castle was a stronghold of the Lindsay family. It was the caput of the Barony of Wauchope. Built as a motte and bailey in the 13th century, it was reconstructed as a tower house in the 15th century before a manse house was constructed at the site, which was a ruin in the 18th century.

References
Coventry, Martin. Castles of the Clans: the strongholds and seats of 750 Scottish families and clans. Musselburgh, 2008. page 337.
CANMORE - Wauchope Castle

Castles in Dumfries and Galloway
Listed castles in Scotland
Clan Lindsay
13th century